The Schlawe and Stolp Land, also known as Słupsk and Sławno Land, is a historical region in Pomerania, centered on the towns of Sławno (Schlawe) and Słupsk (Stolp) in Farther Pomerania, in present-day Poland.

The area is of some historic significance, as it initially was ruled by a cadet branch of the House of Griffin and did not belong to the Duchy of Pomerania (Slavinia) under Duke Wartislaw I and his descendants, when they became vassals of the Holy Roman Emperor in 1181. Ruled by the Samboride dukes of Pomerelia from 1227 and conquered by Margrave Waldemar of Brandenburg-Stendal in 1309, it was not incorporated into the Duchy of Pomerania until 1317.

Geography
The small region comprises the easternmost lands of historic Farther Pomerania, where the Wieprza and Słupia Rivers empty into the Baltic Sea. In the east, the Łeba River marked the historic border with Lauenburg and Bütow Land in Pomerelia (Gdańsk Pomerania).

Since World War II and the implementation of the Oder-Neisse line in 1945, the Farther Pomeranian region belongs to Poland. Part of the larger Szczecin Voivodeship from 1945, the powiats (counties) of Sławno and Słupsk in 1950 were incorporated into Koszalin Voivodeship and from 1975  belonged to the smaller Słupsk Voivodeship. Since the 1998 administrative reform the Lands of Schlawe-Stolp are divided between West Pomeranian Voivodeship (Sławno) and Pomeranian Voivodeship (Słupsk).

History
In the early 12th century, the Pomeranian lands had been again subdued by the Polish prince Bolesław III Wrymouth. His vassal, the Griffin duke Wartislaw, then ruled over the lands around the mouth of the Oder River and Szczecin, while the eastern Lands of Schlawe and Stolp since the 1120s were ruled by his brother Duke Ratibor I.

When Wartislaw was murdered about 1135, Ratibor also assumed the rule over his late brother's duchy as regent for his minor nephews, however upon his own death in 1156, the domains were again separated: Schlawe-Stolp was inherited by Ratibor's sons Swietopelk and Bogislaw, the so-called "Ratiborides" cadet branch of the Griffin House of Pomerania, while their cousin Duke Bogislaw I of Pomerania pledged allegiance to Emperor Frederick Barbarossa in 1181. Nevertheless, all Pomerania was under Danish occupation from the 1180s to 1227.

Samborides
The last member of the Ratiborides branch of the Griffins, Ratibor II, died in 1223. This led to an inheritance dispute between the Pomeranian Griffins and the Samborides dukes of neighbouring Pomerelia, vassals of the Piast Kingdom of Poland. As Ratibor II had died during the Danish period, Denmark administered the area until she had to withdraw after the lost Battle of Bornhöved in 1227. Duke Barnim I of Pomerania immediately took control of the lands after the Danish withdrawal, but had to yield rights to the Pomerelian duke Swietopelk II, who claimed a closer relationship to the extinct Ratiborides, and took over Schlawe-Stolp in 1235/36.

In the 1250s, the Pomeranian dukes mounted an unsuccessful campaign to regain the area. After the death of Duke Swietopelk II in 1266, Duke Barnim I of Pomerania again assumed the rule over the Land of Schlawe, which he ceded to Prince Vitslav II of Rügen, the founder of Rügenwalde, in 1269. However, the Griffins had to cope with the rising Margraves of Brandenburg, who had secured their enfeoffment with Pomerania by Emperor Frederick II in 1231. On 1 April 1269 the Ascanian margraves John II, Otto IV and Conrad of Brandenburg-Stendal signed the Treaty of Arnswalde with late Swantopelks's son Duke Mestwin II of Pomerelia and acquired the seignory over Schlawe-Stolp.

Finally on 3 September 1273 the Lands of Schlawe and Stolp became a fief under the Imperial Margraviate of Brandenburg. Contested by Duke Mestwin II of Pomerelia, Prince Vitslav II of Rügen finally withdrew in 1275 and two years later sold his rights to the area for 3.500 Brandenburgian Marks in silver to the Margraves of Brandenburg. In 1283, Mestwin II of Pomerelia finally took over. With his death in 1294 the Samborides dynasty became extinct. Competition arose anew, as in his testimony late Duke Mestwin II had ignored his earlier contracts and by the secret Treaty of Kępno had inserted the former Polish High Duke, Przemysł II of Greater Poland, as his successor.

Inheritance conflict

Przemysł II was crowned King of Poland in 1295 and assumed the rule over the Pomerelian lands with Schlawe-Stolp. However, after he was murdered the next year, the lands of Schlawe, Stolp and Rügenwalde fell to the Brandenburgian House of Ascania: A last attempt had been made by Przemysł II to occupy  the region, but in 1296 the Polish invasion troops were beaten by a Pomeranian contingent in a decisive battle near Bukowo, a village in the vicinity of the town of Rügenwalde.

the death of King Przemysł II of Poland in 1296, a conflict over his succession broke out between his Piast cousin Władysław I the Elbow-high and the Bohemian king Wenceslaus II. According to a chronic of 1652 by M. Merian, the Schlawe-Stolp lands were again taken over by Vitslav of Rügen and Count Adolph from Holstein. In 1301 Vitslav's son Prince Sambor of Rügen enfeoffed his castellan Matthew in Schlawe with his domains in the surroundings of Schlawe, Rügenwalde and Stolp. The Pomeranian dukes, acting under the sovereignty of Brandenburg, were forced out and had to withdraw at about 1301, after Wenceslaus II had become king of both Poland and Bohemia. He inserted a Polish administrator in the lands of Schlawe and Stolp, Frederic of Čachovice, a Czech noble, who appeared in Schlawe in December 1302.

After both King Wenceslaus II and his young successor, Wenceslaus III, had died, Duke Władysław I could reconquer large parts of the Polish territories. In 1305 the Brandenburg margraves had returned to the lands of Schlawe, Rügenwalde and Stolp. In 1307 they launched from the region a campaign against the fortified castle of Gdańsk in Pomerelia. The attack failed, however, since the local warlord, Wŀadisŀaw Ŀokietek, had recruited soldiers of the Teutonic Knights in order to help defending it. After the Teutonic takeover of Danzig in November 1308, whereby the Knights seized the city and allegedly slaughtered many of the inhabitants, the Ascanian Margrave Waldemar of Brandenburg-Stendal by the Treaty of Soldin sold his claims to Pomerelia east of the Łeba River to the Teutonic Order for the sum of 10,000 silver marks, but retained Schlawe-Stolp. Grand Master Siegfried von Feuchtwangen and Master Heinrich von Dirschau und Schwetz integrated remaining Gdańsk Pomerania into their Monastic State. Emperor Henry VII ratified the Soldin Treaty in 1313, and, though he could not assert any feudal claims to the territory of the extinct Samboride dukes, the now Brandenburgian Lands of Schlawe and Stolp finally were incorporated into the Holy Roman Empire.

Duchy of Pomerania

The districts of Schlawe (now Sławno), Rügenwalde (Darłowo) and Stolp (Słupsk), remained with the Margraviate of Brandenburg and were ruled by the margraves' vassals, the Swienca family, who had administered the area already before under other dynasties. Upon the 1317 Treaty of Templin, the Griffin duke Wartislaw IV of Pomerania-Wolgast could take over these areas as a fief from Margrave Waldemar of Brandenburg. In 1347, the area became fully attached to the Duchy of Pomerania-Wolgast. The lands of Stolp were pawned to the Teutonic Order from 1329 to 1341, the Bütow area was bought by the Order in 1329 and thus remained outside Pomerania-Wolgast.

The lands of Schlawe and Stolp became part of the Duchy of Pomerania-Stolp after the partition of the Pomeranian duchy in 1368. While the Pomerelian lands were incorporated into the Polish province of Royal Prussia in 1466, the eastern border of the lands of Schlawe and Stolp to Pomerelia shifted several times, before they, together with adjacent Lauenburg and Bütow Land, were integrated into the Prussian Province of Pomerania in 1653.

See also
Duchy of Pomerania
History of Pomerania
List of Pomeranian duchies and dukes

Citations

Notes

References

History of Pomerania